Potetball (also known as ball, klubb, kumle, komle, kompe, raspeball) is  a traditional Norwegian potato dumpling. A similar German dish is called Kartoffelklöße.

The main ingredient is peeled potatoes, which are grated or ground up and mixed with flour, usually Barley or wheat, to make the balls stick together. Depending on the proportion of potato pulp and different types of flour, the product will have a different taste and texture.

The dish is more common in the southern region (Sørlandet) where "kompe" is the most common name, western region (Vestlandet) where the terms "raspeball", "komle", and  "potetball"  are the most used and middle region (Trøndelag) where it is nearly always called "klubb". In Vestlandet, this dish is traditionally consumed on Thursdays, when it often makes an appearance as "dish of the day" at cafes and restaurants specializing in local cuisine, commonly known as "Komle-torsdag".

There are a great variety of regional variations to the dish and the condiments vary locally. They may include salted and boiled pork or lamb meat, bacon, sausages, melted butter, boiled carrots, mashed or cooked rutabaga, sour cream,   kefir or soured milk, cured meat, brown cheese sauce and even boiled potatoes. A variety of raspeballer is the  fiskeball (also called blandaball/blandetball), where minced fish, fresh or salted, is added to the potato dough.

See also
 Kroppkaka-  Swedish boiled potato dumplings
 Palt -  Swedish meat-filled potato dumpling 
Knödel - German potato dumplings commonly found in Central European and East European cuisine
 Cepelinai - Lithuanian dumplings made from grated and riced potatoes

References

Norwegian cuisine
German cuisine
Swedish cuisine
Dumplings
Potato dishes